Route 22 is a , two-lane, uncontrolled-access, secondary highway in eastern Prince Edward Island. Its southern terminus is at Route 210 and Route 320 in Montague and its northern terminus is at Route 2 in Mount Stewart. The route is in Kings and Queens counties.

Route description 

The route begins at its southern terminus and goes north to Saint Theresa where it curves to go towards the northwest. It reaches Mount Stewart, crosses the Hillsborough River, and ends at its northern terminus.

References 

022
022
022